Shih Chih-ming (born 29 October 1952) is a Taiwanese politician of the Kuomintang party. He served two consecutive terms as mayor of Tainan City, from 1989 to 1997.

He contested the 2001 Tainan municipal election as an independent, and was not elected to the Tainan City Council. During that election cycle, Shih was indicted by the Tainan City Prosecutors' Office on corruption charges. The Supreme Court ruled on charges of bribery against Shih in July 2005, sentencing him to eight years and six months imprisonment.

References

1952 births
Mayors of Tainan
Living people
Kuomintang politicians in Taiwan
Politicians of the Republic of China on Taiwan from Tainan
Taiwanese politicians convicted of bribery
Taiwanese politicians convicted of corruption